Isocoma azteca, common names Apache jimmyweed or Aztec goldenbush, is a plant species native to Arizona and New Mexico.

Herbage is glabrous or with scattered stipitate glands but not resinous. Flowers are yellow with dark orange veins, 18-25 disc flowers per head.

References

azteca
Flora of Arizona
Flora of New Mexico
Plants described in 1991